The UK Albums Chart is a weekly record chart based on album sales from Friday to Thursday in the United Kingdom (the chart week ran from Sunday to Saturday until 2015). It listed only physical album sales until 2007, after which it has also included albums sold digitally, and from March 2015, includes streamed tracks. The chart is currently compiled by the Official Charts Company (OCC) on behalf of the UK music industry, and each week's new number one is first announced on Friday evenings (Sunday evenings until July 2015) by BBC Radio 1 on their weekly chart show.

The album chart was first published by Record Mirror on 28 July 1956—the album at number one that week was Songs for Swingin' Lovers! by Frank Sinatra. , 1,000 different albums have reached the top of the chart; 12 artists have topped the chart with nine or more different albums. The most successful act is the Beatles, who have reached number one with fifteen records and spent 176 weeks at the top, longer than any other artist. Robbie Williams is the most successful solo artist with 14 number-one albums, while Madonna is the most successful female artist with 12 number ones.

Artists
The following artists have been credited on at least nine different number-one albums, as recognised by the OCC. Appearances on compilation albums featuring various artists are not included. Artists with the same amount of number-one albums are ordered by the earlier date of accumulation.

See also
List of artists by number of UK Singles Chart number ones
List of best-selling albums in the United Kingdom
List of one-hit wonders on the UK Albums Chart
List of UK Albums Chart Christmas number ones
List of UK Albums Chart number ones

References

Notes

External links
Official UK Albums Top 100 at the Official Charts Company
The Official UK Top 40 Albums Chart at BBC Radio 1

Lists of artists by record chart achievement